Walter Cabrera  (born 7 January 1990) is a professional Paraguayan football defender who currently plays for 12 de Octubre.

Career
Cabrera began his career with General Díaz in 2013, before moving on loan to Major League Soccer club FC Dallas on August 7, 2014.

References

External links
 
 

1990 births
Living people
Paraguayan footballers
Paraguayan expatriate footballers
General Díaz footballers
FC Dallas players
12 de Octubre Football Club players
Paraguayan Primera División players
Expatriate soccer players in the United States
Association football defenders
Paraguayan expatriate sportspeople in the United States